Computer graphics is a sub-field of computer science which studies methods for digitally synthesizing and manipulating visual content.  Although the term often refers to the study of three-dimensional computer graphics, it also encompasses two-dimensional graphics and image processing.

Overview 
Computer graphics studies manipulation of visual and geometric information using computational techniques.  It focuses on the mathematical and computational foundations of image generation and processing rather than purely aesthetic issues.  Computer graphics is often differentiated from the field of visualization, although the two fields have many similarities.

Connected studies include:
 Applied mathematics
 Computational geometry
 Computational topology
 Computer vision
 Image processing
 Information visualization
 Scientific visualization

Applications of computer graphics include:
Print design
Digital art
Special effects
Video games
Visual effects

History 

There are several international conferences and journals where the most significant results in computer graphics are published. Among them are the SIGGRAPH and Eurographics conferences and the Association for Computing Machinery (ACM) Transactions on Graphics journal. The joint Eurographics and ACM SIGGRAPH symposium series features the major venues for the more specialized sub-fields: Symposium on Geometry Processing, Symposium on Rendering, Symposium on Computer Animation, and High Performance Graphics. 

As in the rest of computer science, conference publications in computer graphics are generally more significant than journal publications (and subsequently have lower acceptance rates).

Subfields 
A broad classification of major subfields in computer graphics might be:
 Geometry: ways to represent and process surfaces
 Animation: ways to represent and manipulate motion
 Rendering: algorithms to reproduce light transport
 Imaging: image acquisition or image editing

Geometry 

The subfield of geometry studies the representation of three-dimensional objects in a discrete digital setting.  Because the appearance of an object depends largely on its exterior, boundary representations are most commonly used.  Two dimensional surfaces are a good representation for most objects, though they may be non-manifold.  Since surfaces are not finite, discrete digital approximations are used. Polygonal meshes (and to a lesser extent subdivision surfaces) are by far the most common representation, although point-based representations have become more popular recently (see for instance the Symposium on Point-Based Graphics). These representations are Lagrangian, meaning the spatial locations of the samples are independent.  Recently, Eulerian surface descriptions (i.e., where spatial samples are fixed) such as level sets have been developed into a useful representation for deforming surfaces which undergo many topological changes (with fluids being the most notable example).

Geometry subfields include:
 Implicit surface modeling – an older subfield which examines the use of algebraic surfaces, constructive solid geometry, etc., for surface representation.
 Digital geometry processing – surface reconstruction, simplification, fairing, mesh repair, parameterization, remeshing, mesh generation, surface compression, and surface editing all fall under this heading.
 Discrete differential geometry – a nascent field which defines geometric quantities for the discrete surfaces used in computer graphics.
 Point-based graphics – a recent field which focuses on points as the fundamental representation of surfaces.
 Subdivision surfaces
 Out-of-core mesh processing – another recent field which focuses on mesh datasets that do not fit in main memory.

Animation 
The subfield of animation studies descriptions for surfaces (and other phenomena) that move or deform over time.  Historically, most work in this field has focused on parametric and data-driven models, but recently physical simulation has become more popular as computers have become more powerful computationally.

Animation subfields include:
 Performance capture
 Character animation
 Physical simulation (e.g. cloth modeling,  animation of fluid dynamics, etc.)

Rendering 

Rendering generates images from a model.  Rendering may simulate light transport to create realistic images or it may create images that have a particular artistic style in non-photorealistic rendering.  The two basic operations in realistic rendering are transport (how much light passes from one place to another) and scattering (how surfaces interact with light).  See Rendering (computer graphics) for more information.

Rendering subfields include:
 Transport describes how illumination in a scene gets from one place to another. Visibility is a major component of light transport.
 Scattering: Models of scattering (how light interacts with the surface at a given point) and shading (how material properties vary across the surface) are used to describe the appearance of a surface.  In graphics these problems are often studied within the context of rendering since they can substantially affect the design of rendering algorithms.  Descriptions of scattering are usually given in terms of a bidirectional scattering distribution function (BSDF).  The latter issue addresses how different types of scattering are distributed across the surface (i.e., which scattering function applies where).  Descriptions of this kind are typically expressed with a program called a shader.  (Note that there is some confusion since the word "shader" is sometimes used for programs that describe local geometric variation.)
 Non-photorealistic rendering
 Physically based rendering – concerned with generating images according to the laws of geometric optics
 Real-time rendering – focuses on rendering for interactive applications, typically using specialized hardware like GPUs
 Relighting – recent area concerned with quickly re-rendering scenes

Notable researchers 

 Arthur Appel
 James Arvo
 Brian A. Barsky
 Jim Blinn
 Jack E. Bresenham
 Loren Carpenter 
 Edwin Catmull
 James H. Clark
 Robert L. Cook
 Franklin C. Crow
 Paul Debevec
 David C. Evans
 Ron Fedkiw
 Steven K. Feiner
 James D. Foley
 David Forsyth
 Henry Fuchs
 Andrew Glassner
 Henri Gouraud (computer scientist)
 Donald P. Greenberg
 Eric Haines
 R. A. Hall
 Pat Hanrahan
 John Hughes
 Jim Kajiya
 Takeo Kanade
 Kenneth Knowlton
 Marc Levoy
 Martin Newell (computer scientist)
 James O'Brien
 Ken Perlin
 Matt Pharr
 Bui Tuong Phong
 Przemyslaw Prusinkiewicz
 William Reeves
 David F. Rogers
 Holly Rushmeier
 Peter Shirley
 James Sethian
 Ivan Sutherland
 Demetri Terzopoulos
 Kenneth Torrance
 Greg Turk
 Andries van Dam
 Henrik Wann Jensen
 Gregory Ward
 John Warnock
 J. Turner Whitted
 Lance Williams

Applications for their use 
Bitmap Design / Image Editing
 Adobe Photoshop
 Corel Photo-Paint
 GIMP
 Krita

Vector drawing
 Adobe Illustrator
 CorelDRAW
 Inkscape
 Affinity Designer
 Sketch

Architecture
 VariCAD
 FreeCAD 
 AutoCAD
 QCAD
 LibreCAD
 DataCAD
 Corel Designer

Video editing
 Adobe Premiere Pro
 Sony Vegas
 Final Cut
 DaVinci Resolve
 Cinelerra
 VirtualDub

Sculpting, Animation, and 3D Modeling
 Blender 3D
 Wings 3D
 ZBrush 
 Sculptris 
 SolidWorks
 Rhino3D
 SketchUp
 Houdini
 3ds Max
 Cinema 4D
 Maya
 Houdini

Digital composition
 Nuke
 Blackmagic Fusion
 Adobe After Effects
 Natron

Rendering
 V-Ray
 RedShift
 RenderMan
 Octane Render
 Mantra
 Lumion (Architectural visualization)

Other applications examples
 ACIS - geometric core
 Autodesk Softimage
 POV-Ray
 Scribus
 Silo
 Hexagon
 Lightwave

See also 

 Computer facial animation
 Computer science
 Computer science and engineering
 Computer graphics
 Digital geometry
 Digital image editing
 Geometry processing
 IBM PCPG, (1980s)
 Painter's algorithm
 Stanford Bunny
 Utah Teapot

References

Further reading 
 Foley et al. Computer Graphics: Principles and Practice.
 Shirley. Fundamentals of Computer Graphics.
 Watt. 3D Computer Graphics.

External links 

 A Critical History of Computer Graphics and Animation
 History of Computer Graphics series of articles

Industry 
Industrial labs doing "blue sky" graphics research include:
Adobe Advanced Technology Labs
MERL
Microsoft Research – Graphics
Nvidia Research

Major film studios notable for graphics research include:
ILM
PDI/Dreamworks Animation
Pixar

+